Perry High School is a high school in Perry, Georgia, United States. The school serves Perry, Georgia. It is part of the Houston County School District. The mascot of Perry High School is the Panther. The school's colors are maroon and gold.

Alumni 
 Casey Hayward - cornerback for the Atlanta Falcons and philanthropist
 Sam Nunn - United States Senator
 Deborah Roberts - television journalist
 Dontarrious Thomas - football linebacker
 Kiwaukee Thomas - retired NFL cornerback
 Al Thornton - professional basketball player
 Kanorris Davis - previously New England Patriots safety/linebacker

References

External links

 Perry High School
 PHS Panthers Football
 PHS "Panther Regiment" Band

Schools in Houston County, Georgia
Public high schools in Georgia (U.S. state)